An unofficial Australian cricket team toured South Africa in the 1986–87 season to play a series of unofficial Test and one day matches. It was the second of two tours by the side, the first being in 1985–86. The series was highly controversial in Australia and its Australian participants were banned from interstate cricket for two seasons and international cricket for three seasons.

Australian squad
The squad consisted of the following:
Batsmen – Kim Hughes, Graham Yallop, Steve Smith, John Dyson,  Mick Taylor, Mike Haysman, Kepler Wessels, Greg Shipperd (reserve keeper)
Fast bowlers – Terry Alderman, Carl Rackemann, John Maguire, Rod McCurdy, Rodney Hogg
Spin bowlers – Tom Hogan, Trevor Hohns 
All-rounder – Peter Faulkner
Wicket-keeper – Steve Rixon

Matches

Unofficial "Test" matches
A series of four unofficial "Test" matches were scheduled.  As happened the previous year the series was won 1–0 by South Africa, who won the opening match in Johannesburg, while the three remaining matches were all drawn.

First "Test"

Second "Test"

Third "Test"

Fourth "Test"

Legacy
A number of tourists on this “rebel” tour went on to play first-class cricket in South Africa, including Kim Hughes, Steve Smith, Mike Haysman, Rod McCurdy and John Maguire; McCurdy and Haysman wound up moving there permanently.  ​South African-born Kepler Wessels, who had been playing in Australia since 1978, returned to the country of his birth, ultimately becoming its first captain upon their return to official Test cricket in 1992.

References

External links
Australian XI in South Africa in 1986–87 at Cricinfo
Australian XI in South Africa in 1986–87 at Cricket Archive

1986 in Australian cricket
1986 in South African cricket
1987 in Australian cricket
1987 in South African cricket
Australian cricket tours of South Africa
Rebel
International cricket competitions from 1985–86 to 1988
Cricket and apartheid
Cricket controversies
Controversies in Australia